Grotella is a genus of moths of the family Noctuidae first described by Leon F. Harvey in 1875.

Species
 Grotella binda Barnes, 1907
 Grotella blanca Barnes, 1904
 Grotella blanchardi McElvare, 1966
 Grotella citronella Barnes & McDunnough, 1916
 Grotella dis Grote, 1883
 Grotella grisescens (Barnes & McDunnough, 1910)
 Grotella harveyi Barnes & Benjamin, 1922
 Grotella margueritaria Blanchard, 1968
 Grotella melanocrypta (Dyar, 1912)
 Grotella olivacea Barnes & McDunnough, 1911
 Grotella parvipuncta Barnes & McDunnough, 1912
 Grotella pyronaea Druce, 1895
 Grotella sampita Barnes, 1907
 Grotella septempunctata Harvey, 1875
 Grotella soror Barnes & McDunnough, 1912
 Grotella stretchi Barnes & Benjamin, 1922
 Grotella tricolor Barnes, 1904
 Grotella vagans Barnes & Benjamin, 1922
 Grotella vauriae McElvare, 1950

References

External links
 Pictures of Grotella moths.